Xestia alaskae is a moth of the family Noctuidae. It is found in the  Yukon Territory and Alaska.

References

Xestia
Moths of North America
Moths described in 1876